Joseph Lizardo (born 17 January 1969) is a Filipino former professional tennis player.

Tennis career
Born and raised in Manila, Lizardo played in the junior draws of Wimbledon and the US Open, before taking up a full scholarship to Temple University in Philadelphia. He won an A-10 singles championship in 1987 and graduated with a business/marketing degree in 1991.

Lizardo represented the Philippines in the Davis Cup as well as in regional events, including the 1994 Asian Games. He won six medals for the Philippines at the Southeast Asian Games. In Davis Cup competition, Lizardo featured in a total of 14 ties, from 1992 to 1999, winning 12 singles rubbers. His best win came against former top-50 player Shuzo Matsuoka of Japan in 1995.

Personal life
Now based in California, Lizardo is married to Filipino American actress Belinda Panelo.

References

External links
 
 
 

1969 births
Living people
Filipino male tennis players
Asian Games competitors for the Philippines
Tennis players at the 1994 Asian Games
Temple Owls tennis players
College men's tennis players in the United States
Southeast Asian Games medalists in tennis
Southeast Asian Games silver medalists for the Philippines
Southeast Asian Games bronze medalists for the Philippines
Competitors at the 1995 Southeast Asian Games
Competitors at the 1997 Southeast Asian Games
Competitors at the 1999 Southeast Asian Games
Competitors at the 2001 Southeast Asian Games
Sportspeople from Manila